The 2013 Gobowling.com 400 was a NASCAR Sprint Cup Series stock car race that was held on August 4, 2013, at Pocono Raceway in Long Pond, Pennsylvania. Contested over 160 laps on the 2.5-mile (4.023 km) triangular superspeedway, it was the twenty-first race of the 2013 NASCAR Sprint Cup Series season. Kasey Kahne of Hendrick Motorsports won the race, his second win of the season, while Jeff Gordon finished second. Kurt Busch, Ryan Newman, and Dale Earnhardt Jr. rounded out the top five. The race was one of the most competitive races held at Pocono Raceway, as there were nine cautions, 14 different leaders, and 27 lead changes.

Report

Background
The track's turns are banked differently; the first is banked at 14°, the second turn at 8° and the final turn with 6°. However, each of the three straightaways are banked at 2°. The front stretch at Pocono Raceway is 3,740 feet long, the longest at the track. The back stretch, is 3,055 feet long, while the short stretch, which connects turn two with turn three, is only 1,780 feet long. Jeff Gordon was the defending race winner after winning the race in 2012.

Before the race, Jimmie Johnson was leading the Drivers' Championship with 740 points, while Clint Bowyer stood in second with 665 points. Carl Edwards followed in the third with 655, seven points ahead of Kevin Harvick and 39 ahead of Dale Earnhardt Jr. in fourth and fifth. Matt Kenseth, with 615 points, was in sixth; five ahead of Kyle Busch, who was scored seventh. Eighth-placed Greg Biffle was one point ahead of Kasey Kahne and six ahead of Gordon in ninth and tenth. In the Manufacturers' Championship, Chevrolet was leading with 143 points, twelve points ahead of Toyota. Ford was third after recording only 99 points before the race.

Practice and qualifying

Three practice sessions are scheduled to be held before the race. The first session, scheduled on August 2, 2013, was 90 minutes long. The second and third, held a day later on August 3, 2013, will last 50 minutes each. In the first practice session, Kurt Busch was the quickest with a best lap time of 50.600 seconds. Kyle Busch followed in second, ahead of Greg Biffle and Jeff Burton in third and fourth. Joey Logano was scored fifth quickest with a best lap time of 50.929, 329 thousandths of a second slower than Kurt Busch. Kahne, Marcos Ambrose, Ryan Newman, Denny Hamlin, and Edwards completed the top-ten.

Kyle Busch, who completed his lap in 49.823 seconds, will start alongside Johnson on the grid, in front of Edwards, Newman, and Kurt Busch. Logano, with a lap time of 50.111 seconds, was scored sixth ahead of Biffle  and Ambrose in seventh and eighth. Hamlin and Aric Almirola completed the first ten grid positions with lap times of 28.162 and 28.191. After the session concluded, Johnson explained why his car was late to the qualifying grid, "We had a left rear toe (tire angle) was off by a thousandth of an inch. The system is pass-fail... a thousandth of an inch. I'm glad we got it sorted out."

Race
Before the race, NASCAR decided that there would be a competition caution on lap 20 because of Saturday practice being washed out.

Jimmie Johnson led the field to the green flag, but the field had only gotten through the first turn when the first caution came out for a crash, as Juan Pablo Montoya washed up the track into Ricky Stenhouse Jr., causing Stenhouse to spin out. Matt Kenseth was also collected. Montoya would finish three laps down in 28th, Kenseth would finish in 22nd on the lead lap, and Stenhouse would end up in 34th place, 46 laps down.

The race restarted on lap 5, with Johnson still leading. On lap 16, the second caution of the race came out when Denny Hamlin spun and hit the wall in turn 3. Hamlin would ultimately be credited with a last place finish. Due to its proximity to lap 20, NASCAR declared this to be the competition caution.

On the restart, Johnson continued to lead, and led until lap 33 when he pitted for a green flag pit stop, handing the lead to Brad Keselowski. A cycle of green flag pit stops was carried out over the next fifteen laps. Due to some cars staying out on the previous caution, the lead changed several times between lap 33 and lap 48. Keselowski led one lap before pitting. Kurt Busch then led seven laps before pitting. Dale Earnhardt Jr., Matt Kenseth and Jamie McMurray then each stayed out to lead a lap before pitting, which cycled the lead back to Johnson on lap 48.

On lap 53, the third caution came out when David Gilliland cut a right-front tire in the Tunnel Turn and hit the outside wall. Johnson and most of the leaders pitted under the caution. Ultimately, Johnson had a slow pit stop and ended up restarting in the middle of the pack. At the restart on lap 58, Keselowski led the field to the green flag. He led for four laps before a fast-charging Kasey Kahne managed to overtake him. Kahne led for ten laps before taking a green flag pit stop (he and Keselowski were on an off-sequence strategy). Ryan Newman held the lead for two laps before pitting, which handed the lead to Johnson. Johnson led until lap 75, when he pitted, giving the lead to Tony Stewart.

On lap 78, the fourth caution flag came out when Johnson cut a right front tire coming off the first turn and slapped the outside wall. This damaged his car significantly, and he stayed at the back of the lead lap for most of the remainder of the race, until his crew discovered that a spark plug had been knocked loose. Once this problem had been fixed, he rallied back to a 13th-place finish. Kahne reassumed the lead under caution.

At the restart on lap 82, Kahne and Keselowski were again at the front of the field. Over the next 13 laps, the two drivers exchanged the lead several times, until the fifth caution came out on lap 96 when David Stremme cut a right front tire in turn 1. Most of the leaders pitted under this caution, but Martin Truex Jr. stayed out and assumed the lead for the restart on lap 100. He then led the next three laps. On lap 104, the sixth caution came out when Aric Almirola cut a left rear tire and spun in turn 3 after contact with Timmy Hill.

Kahne reassumed the lead under caution and continued to lead at the restart on lap 107. On lap 110, the seventh caution flag came out for a four car accident at the Tunnel Turn exit. Danica Patrick was racing Travis Kvapil for 17th place when the two made contact and both cars got loose and spun. Kvapail was able to save his car, but Danica ended up being hit by Paul Menard and Jeff Burton.

The race restarted on lap 116 with Kahne still leading. Kahne continued to lead until a set of green flag pit stops on lap 130. As Kahne  pitted, Kurt Busch assumed the lead for two laps before pitting, handing the lead to Almirola for lap 132. Almirola led that lap, then Dave Blaney assumed the lead for three laps before pitting on lap 135. David Ragan then held the lead for one lap before the lead cycled back to Kahne.

With 15 laps to go, three of the four Hendrick Motorsports cars were leading the field, with Kahne leading Gordon and Earnhardt Jr. The top five (the three Hendrick cars, plus Newman and Kurt Busch) were Chevrolets. Kahne was able to use lapped traffic to build up a 7.5 second lead on Gordon. This continued until lap 150, when the eighth caution came out for debris, erasing Kahne's lead on Gordon.  Kahne restarted on the outside lane on lap 153. Kahne held the lead until Gordon overtook him in the Tunnel Turn. Gordon appeared to be on his way to his first victory of the season, but on lap 156, his lead was erased when Matt Kenseth spun in the Tunnel Turn.

On the last restart on lap 158, Gordon restarted on the inside and Kahne restarted on the outside. Gordon got a jump on the restart ahead of Kahne and Newman. Kahne caught up to Gordon and the two cars raced side by side down the Long Pond straightaway. Kahne cleared Gordon in the Tunnel Turn and assumed the lead at the white flag. He then held off Gordon and Kurt Busch over the last lap to win his second race of the season and his second Pocono race win.

Newman finished fourth, and Earnhardt Jr. finished fifth. Keselowski finished sixth, the highest non-Chevrolet finisher in the field. Joey Logano finished seventh, Kyle Busch finished eighth, while Stewart and Greg Biffle rounded out the top ten.

Results

Qualifying

Race results

Notes

  Points include 3 Chase for the Sprint Cup points for winning, 1 point for leading a lap, and 1 point for most laps led.
  Ineligible for driver's championship points.

Standings after the race

Drivers' Championship standings

Manufacturers' Championship standings

Note: Only the first twelve positions are included for the driver standings.

References

Gobowling.com 400
Gobowling.com 400
Gobowling.com 400
NASCAR races at Pocono Raceway